The David Lee Roth Band is an American rock and roll band, formed in 1997 by Van Halen frontman David Lee Roth, John Lowery, Mike Hartman, Terry Kilgore, Tom Lilly, and Ray Luzier.

DLR Band
DLR Band is the only studio album from the David Lee Roth Band. It was recorded and mixed in ten days, a technique Roth had not utilized since 1979's Van Halen II. John Lowery (aka John 5) and Mike Hartman played guitar on the record. Hartman actually performed double duty for the record, performing bass guitar under the "B'ourbon Bob" pseudonym.

DLR Band met with favorable reviews upon release, especially in comparison to his previous two solo efforts (1991's A Little Ain't Enough and 1994's Your Filthy Little Mouth). However, with little promotion and limited distribution from his own smaller label, the album failed to make a significant mark commercially. Further hurting the album's sales was Roth's decision not to tour in support of the album.

Two tracks from DLR Band, "Indeedido" and "King of the Hill", would later appear on Mike Hartman's solo release, Black Glue, as "Southern Romp" and "Stomp", respectively. Written by Hartman, both tracks would be remixed and made instrumental for Hartman's release.

Post-DLR Band
Following the release of the solo album Diamond Dave in 2003 David Lee Roth rejoined his original band Van Halen on their critically acclaimed 2007 North American reunion tour. Following the tour's success, Dave re-entered the studio with Van Halen and recorded A Different Kind of Truth, the first album of entirely new material released with David Lee Roth as frontman and lead vocalist in 24 years.

Band members

 Mike Hartman - guitar
 Terry Kilgore - guitar
 Tom Lilly - bass
 John Lowery - guitar and bass
 Ray Luzier - drums

References

1986 establishments in California
David Lee Roth
Glam metal musical groups from California
Hard rock musical groups from California
Musical groups established in 1986
Musical groups disestablished in 2006
Musical groups reestablished in 2015
Warner Records artists